Tandra Ray is an Indian actress in the Odia film industry.  She worked in Odia-language films during the 1980s and 1990s. She is married to Bijay Mohanty. Her first film was Chilika Teerey opposite Bijay Mohanty.

Filmography
 2013 Haata Dhari Chaaluthaa
 2013 Daha Balunga
 2010 Sasura Ghara Zindabad
 2010 Dil Tate Deichi
 2010 Subha Vivaha
 2009 Love Dot Com
 2007 Lal Tuku Tuku Sadhaba Bahu
 2007 Mahanayak
 2007 Mu Tate Love Karuchi
 2005 I Love You
 2001 Dharma Debata
 2000 Babu Parsuram
 1999 Jai Sriram
 1998 Sahara Jaluchi
 1997 Raghu Arakhita
 1997 Ram Laxman
 1996 Vasudha
 1994 Bhai Hela Bhagari
 1994 Sakhi Rahila Ae Singha Duara
 1993 Bhagya Hate Dori
 1993 Mo Bhai Jaga
 1992 Ghara Mora Swarga
 1992 Panjuri Bhitare Sari
 1991 Aama Ghara Aama Sansara
 1991 Kotia Manish Gotiye Jaga
 1990 Ama Ghara
 1990 Maa Mate Shakti De
 1989 Mamata Ra Dori
 1989 Sagar
 1989 Topaye Sindura Dipata Shankha
 1988 Papa Punya
 1988 Pua Mora Kala Thakura
 1987 Micha Mayara Sansar
 1986 Ei Aama Sansar
 1986 Manika
 1986 Sansara
 1985 Mamata Mage Mula
 1985 Nala Damayanti
 1985 Palataka
 1985 Para Jhia Ghara Bhangena
 1985 Sata Kebe Luchi Rahena
 1982 Basanti Apa
 1981 Arati
 1980 Alibha Daga
 1980 Ram Balram
 1979 Sautuni
 1978 Samarpana
 1978 Pipasha
 1978 Pati Patni
 1977 Chilika Teerey

References

External links

Actresses in Odia cinema
Living people
Indian film actresses
Year of birth missing (living people)
20th-century Indian actresses
21st-century Indian actresses